The 2012 Louisiana–Lafayette Ragin' Cajuns baseball team represented the University of Louisiana at Lafayette in the 2012 NCAA Division I baseball season. The Ragin' Cajuns played their home games at M. L. Tigue Moore Field and were led by eighteenth year head coach Tony Robichaux.

Preseason

Preseason All-Sun Belt team

Tyler Ray (TROY, SR, Pitcher)
Justin Hageman (WKU, SO, Pitcher)
Tanner Perkins (WKU, JR, Pitcher)
Hugh Adams (FAU, SR, Pitcher)
Mason McVay (FIU, RS-JR, Pitcher)
Mike Albaladejo (FAU, SR, Catcher)
Mike Martinez (FIU, SR, 1st Base)
Caleb Clowers (ULM, SR, 2nd Base)
Logan Kirkland (USA, SO, 2nd Base)
Tyler Hannah (TROY, SR, Shortstop)
Hank LaRue (MTSU, SO, 3rd Base)
Pablo Bermudez (FIU, SR, Outfield)
Justin Guidry (MTSU, SR, Outfield)
Rudy Flores (FIU, JR, Designated Hitter)

Roster

Coaching staff

Schedule and results

References

Louisiana-Lafayette
Louisiana Ragin' Cajuns baseball seasons
Louisiana-Lafayette baseball